Incat Tasmania is an Australian manufacturer of high-speed craft (HSC) catamaran ferries. Its greatest success has been with large, sea going passenger and vehicle ferries, but it has also built military transports and since 2015 it has built smaller river and bay ferries. Based in Derwent Park, a suburb of Hobart, Tasmania, Australia, it was founded by Bob Clifford.

The company builds vessels using aluminium construction, wave-piercing and water-jet technology. Vessels have been constructed up to 130 metres in length with a size of 13,000 gross tons and with cruising speeds of up to 58 knots (107 km/h).

Company history

The company began in the 1970s as the Sullivans Cove Ferry Company in suburban Hobart and built four small ferries before International Catamarans was formed in 1977 by a partnership between founder Bob Clifford and marine architect Philip Hercus. This partnership created plans for what was probably the first large wave piercing catamaran in the world. However the partnership was dissolved in 1988 with Clifford remaining in Hobart trading as Incat Tasmania while Hercus returned to Sydney to establish 'Incat Designs (Sydney),' a design-only company that became Incat Crowther after a merger in 2005. Incat Crowther has no association with Incat Tasmania and its ships are built by other companies. Incat Tasmania has its own in-house design company, Revolution Design.

In 1989 Incat Tasmania moved to its present location on Prince of Wales Bay which allowed it to build larger ships and in 1990 Incat delivered its first 74-metre fast catamaran ferry. At the same time, several other companies also began to build large aluminium vehicle carrying ferries. This new type of ship was revolutionary and over the next decade fast cats replaced most hydrofoil and hovercraft services as well as many monohull ferries. The success of this new type of ferry led to other shipbuilders around the world using their yards to build large vehicle carrying aluminium catamarans. However many ferry operators preferred traditional monohull designs and the limited market for fast cats became crowded with manufacturers bidding low to keep their shipyards working.

After the inevitable collapse of the industry, two builders of large catamaran ferries survived, Incat and its Perth based rival Austal. However Incat had needed to downsize and after a brief stint in receivership, the company continued building ferries and developing larger and more efficient designs. With diversification into smaller bay ferries in 2015 and the recovery of the market for large vehicle carrying ferries, Incat Tasmania's workforce expanded rapidly from 2015.

Products

Large wave piercing passenger and vehicle ferries
In 1990 Incat was one of the pioneers of large, fast catamaran ferries and they have been its core product ever since. The type of ship was different from earlier ferries and its instant success led to Incat becoming a major player in the industry. Over the years innovation has led to the ships becoming bigger, faster, more fuel efficient and much more stable on rough seas. Vehicle decks are often movable to make way for high trucks or extra cars.

Ships in this category have been built from 74 to 130 metres long and from 3,000 to 13,000 gross tons. The 99-metre Francisco (Hull 069) is the world's fastest ship in commercial service and can achieve speeds up to 58 knots (107 kmh).

Smaller passenger ferries
Incat began by building small ferries under 37 metres, but from 1990 it concentrated on larger vehicle carrying catamarans. However, in 2015 the company resumed building smaller ferries and in that year it delivered river ferries for operation in London, Hobart and Sydney. Since then it has designed and built more smaller ferries including two 35-metre, 400 passenger ferries (hulls 090 and 095) for commuter runs by Port Phillip Ferries from Melbourne Docklands to Portarlington and Geelong.

Military vessels

In the 1990s several catamarans built by Incat entered naval service as fast transports, including HMAS Jervis Bay with the Royal Australian Navy and HSV-X1Joint Venture, Spearhead and HSV-2 Swift, which served with the United States Armed Forces.

Other vessels

K Class
In the mid 1990s Incat built three K class ferries. They are 70 to 80 metres long, low profile passenger vessels without wave piercing bows or the distinctive centre bow that characterise all other larger Incat ferries. Two were built by Incat in Hobart and a third was built by a Chinese partner. Plans for further Chinese built K Class ferries did not eventuate and Hull NF08 remains the only Incat vessel not built in Hobart.

Oil rig tender 
Most offshore oil rigs are exposed to rough open seas with crew transfers by helicopter and freight needs served by platform supply vessels. However Azerbaijan's offshore oil rigs are in the calmer waters of the Caspian Sea, the world's largest lake, so crew transfers can be comfortably and more economically undertaken by water. Several fast catamarans have been built to transfer both crews and cargo for this market including Incat Hull 074 Muslim Magomayev delivered in 2015. The size of catamarans that can be built for this niche market is restricted by the 16.5-metre width of locks on the Volga-Don Canal that connects the Caspian Sea with the Black Sea and the Mediterranean.

Brooke Street Pier
From 1990 Incat had almost exclusively built large catamarans, but this changed in 2014 when the company diversified into something that was not even a ship, although it did float. An earlier Brooke Street Pier ferry terminal on Hobart's waterfront needed replacement and Incat was commissioned to build an 80 x 20-metre floating pontoon. Hull 077 was towed 8 km from Incat's shipyard to Sullivans Cove before finishing work was done on site. In addition to ferry berths, the pier hosts a restaurant, a cafe and a number of stalls.

Luxury super yachts
The market for opulent motor yachts has grown rapidly this century and while the market is mostly for monohull vessels, catamarans are beginning to make inroads. Incat has released several designs ranging from 80 to 112 metres which are shown on their website, but so far there have been no orders.

Deliveries
In its early years Incat built smaller boats and ferries with little to distinguish it from other boat yards except for a willingness to experiment and innovate. But the revolutionary Hull 023 completed in 1990 was quite different and was the first of the type of ferry that Incat is best known for today with its large capacity, high speed, wave piercing hulls and distinctive centre bow. As one of the first large aluminium vehicle carrying catamarans in the world, it contributed to the big changes in the ferry industry that occurred in the 1990s.

In the Length / Class field of the table WPC means the vessel is a Wave Piercing Catamaran. The three K Class vessels were a low profile design without the wave piercing bows and the capacity to carry fewer cars than traditional Incat designs.

In the competitive ferry industry, ships often change operators, especially in Europe. Other ferries have alternated between summer service in the northern and southern hemispheres every six months. Some Incat vessels of the 1990s have been operated by up to six shipping companies with regular name changes.

Gross Tonnage is a measure of a ship's enclosed volume rather than its weight or displacement, so similar ships can have differing Gross Tonnages due to factors such as if a viewing platform is fully enclosed or open to the weather.

References

External links

Official website
Revolution Design, Incat's in house naval architects

Companies based in Hobart
 
Shipbuilding companies of Australia
Shipyards of Australia
Vehicle manufacturing companies established in 1977
1977 establishments in Australia